Cropsey may refer to:

People
 Alan Cropsey (born 1952), Michigan politician
 Harman B. Cropsey (c. 1775-?), New York politician
 Harmon G. Cropsey (1917–2009), American politician and farmer
 James Church Cropsey, New York police commissioner
 Jasper Francis Cropsey (1823–1900), American landscape artist
 Joseph Cropsey (1919–2012), American political philosopher
 Seth Cropsey (born 1948), American politician

Places
 Cropsey, Illinois
 Cropsey Township, McLean County, Illinois

Other
 Cropsey Avenue, a major street in Brooklyn, New York
 Cropsey (film), a 2009 American film